Ruthny Mathurin (born 14 January 2001) is a Haitian footballer who plays as a defender or midfielder for the Louisiana Ragin' Cajuns in the NCAA Division I and for the Haiti women's national team.

Early life
Born in Port-au-Prince, Haiti, Mathurin is one of three siblings born to her parents, Denise and Hector. She grew up in Gressier, a commune located just west of Port-au-Prince. At the under-12 level, she was identified and moved to the Camp Nous, the training center of the Haitian Football Federation.

International career
Mathurin first represented Haiti at the 2016 CONCACAF Girls' U-15 Championship. She then stepped up to the under-17 level, at which she played at the 2018 CONCACAF Women's U-17 Championship.

Mathurin made her senior debut for Haiti during 2020 CONCACAF Women's Olympic Qualifying Championship qualification. On 3 October 2019, in the Group C opener against Suriname, she started in a 10–0 victory.

Career statistics

References

External links

 

2001 births
Living people
Haitian women's footballers
Sportspeople from Port-au-Prince
Women's association football utility players
Haiti women's international footballers
Haitian expatriate footballers
Expatriate women's soccer players in the United States
Haitian expatriate sportspeople in the United States
Louisiana Ragin' Cajuns women's soccer players